Beverly "Bev" Stein is an activist, lawyer and politician from Oregon who served in various capacities in Portland, but who now lives in Tillamook.

Stein attended the University of California and the University of Wisconsin Law School before moving to Portland, where she helped found the New American Movement's Portland chapter. She was elected in 1988 as a Democrat to represent the 14th district of the Oregon House of Representatives, succeeding fellow Democrat Shirley Gold, who was making a (successful) run for the Oregon State Senate. Stein would remain in that position until she resigned on April 21, 1993 to seek election as chair of the Multnomah County Board. She was succeeded by fellow Democrat George Eighmey.

Stein would win her race for board chair, and served eight years in that position. In 2002, she resigned to run for Governor of Oregon, losing in the Democratic primary election to eventual victor Ted Kulongoski.

References 

Democratic Party members of the Oregon House of Representatives
Oregon lawyers
Politicians from Portland, Oregon
20th-century American politicians
21st-century American politicians
University of Wisconsin Law School alumni
University of California alumni
New American Movement
Living people
Year of birth missing (living people)
Lawyers from Portland, Oregon